This is a list of public holidays in Belize.

Public holidays 

(*) Moveable holidays
(**) Replacement days:
Note 1 – Chapter 289 of the laws of Belize states that if the holiday falls on a Sunday, the following Monday is observed as the bank and public holiday.
Note 2 – Chapter 289 of the laws of Belize states that if the holiday falls on a Sunday or a Friday, the following Monday is observed as the bank and public holiday; further, if the holiday falls on a Tuesday, Wednesday or Thursday, the preceding Monday is observed as the bank and public holiday.

Variable holidays

2020
9 March, Monday: National Heroes and Benefactors Day
10 April, Friday: Good Friday
11 April, Saturday: Holy Saturday
13 April, Monday: Easter Monday
25 May, Monday: Commonwealth Day
28 December, Monday: Boxing Day Holiday
2021
2 April, Friday: Good Friday
3 April, Saturday: Holy Saturday
5 April, Monday: Easter Monday
24 May, Monday: Commonwealth Day
11 October, Monday: Pan America Day
27 December, Monday: Boxing Day Holiday
2022
7 March, Monday: National Heroes and Benefactors Day
15 April, Friday: Good Friday
16 April, Saturday: Holy Saturday
18 April, Monday: Easter Monday
2 May	Monday: Labour Day Holiday
23 May, Monday: Commonwealth Day
10 October, Monday: Pan America Day
2023
2 January, Monday: New Year Holiday
6 March, Monday: National Heroes and Benefactors Day
7 April, Friday: Good Friday
8 April, Saturday: Holy Saturday
10 April, Monday: Easter Monday
29 May, Monday: Sovereign's Day
11 September, Monday: Saint George's Caye Holiday
9 October, Monday: Pan America Day
20 November, Monday: Garifuna Settlement Holiday

References 

 Laws of Belize Chapter 289

 
Society of Belize
Belizean culture
Belize